Palestinian Textbooks: From Arafat to Abbas and Hamas is a March 2008 publication by the Institute for Monitoring Peace and Cultural Tolerance in School Education (IMPACT-SE) and the American Jewish Committee (AJC). The book summarizes former analyses by IMPACT-SE of Palestinian Authority textbooks, beginning in 1998, and outlines how Palestinian school textbooks have changed or not changed under the leadership of Yassir Arafat, Mahmoud Abbas, and Hamas regarding the portrayal of peace and the 'Other', namely Israel and Jews.

See also
 Institute for Monitoring Peace and Cultural Tolerance in School Education
 Textbooks in the Israeli–Palestinian conflict
 Israeli textbook controversy
 Israeli–Palestinian conflict
 Arab–Israeli conflict

References

External links
 
 
 

Textbooks in the Middle East
2008 non-fiction books